Tarajing Potpot is a Philippine sitcom that aired on ABS-CBN from March 6, 1999 to June 10, 2000.

Cast
 Ian Veneracion as Andres
 Paolo Contis
 Mansueto Velasco
 Bentong as Diego
 Nikki Valdez
 Chris Aguilar
 Rommel Velasco
 Edgar Mortiz

See also
 List of programs aired by ABS-CBN

ABS-CBN original programming
Philippine television sitcoms
1999 Philippine television series debuts
2000 Philippine television series endings
Filipino-language television shows